Footprints is the third studio album by Nigerian singer Duncan Mighty. It was released on November 22, 2013.

Background

The 18-track album has a running time of 77 minutes and features Timaya, Wande Coal, Shaggy, Otuu Sax, and Sandaz Black. It is the follow-up to his 2011 album Legacy (Ahamefuna).

Reception 

Ayomide Tayo of Nigerian Entertainment Today reviewed that the album Footprints is a raw, sometimes unprocessed body of work by Duncan Mighty. The reviewer added that Footprints is a direct and honest album while noting that there are a few moments when the album feels bland and uninspiring. "Tracks such as 'Hustlers Anthem', 'Manuchim-Soh', 'Owhornu-Ogwu' slows down the lengthy album which boasts of 18 tracks", he said.

Track listing

See also

 List of 2013 albums
 Music of Port Harcourt

References 

2013 albums
Duncan Mighty albums